Credit transfer can refer to:

 The transfer of money from one account to another, also called a wire transfer
 The procedure of granting credit to a student for studies completed at another school, is also called transfer credit or advanced standing